"Lullaby" is a song by American rock singer Shawn Mullins from his fourth studio album, Soul's Core (1998). It was released in August 1998 and is Mullins' most successful song to date, reaching number one on the US Billboard Adult Top 40, number seven on the Billboard Hot 100, and number nine on the Billboard Modern Rock Tracks chart. It also found success abroad, reaching number nine on the UK Singles Chart, number five in Australia, and number two in Canada.

The song has appeared on thirty-two different releases including the original album, Soul's Core, greatest hits albums, 1990s compilations and acoustic compilations. It was also sung by Dave Allen in the 2011 film Bad Teacher.

Content
The song is said to be about "a girl who is feeling depressed, crying out for a life away from her upbringing, a life full of Hollywood days and movie star-filled nights."

Track listings

US 7-inch single
A. "Lullaby" – 5:30
B. "The Gulf of Mexico" – 3:43

UK CD single
 "Lullaby" (single version) – 4:32
 "Lullaby" (acoustic) – 4:53
 "Changes" – 3:33

European CD single
 "Lullaby" (single version) – 4:32
 "Lullaby" (album version) – 5:30

Australian CD single
 "Lullaby" (single version) – 4:32
 "Lullaby" (acoustic version) – 4:53
 "The Gulf of Mexico" – 3:43

Credits and personnel
Credits are taken from the European CD single liner notes.

Studios
 Recorded at Orphan Studios and Southern Living at Its Finest (Atlanta, Georgia, US)
 Mixed at Encore Studios (Burbank, California, US)
 Mastered at Masterdisk (New York City)

Personnel
 Shawn Mullins – writing, vocals, production
 Glenn Matullo – recording
 Tom Lord-Alge – mixing
 Scott Hull – mastering

Charts

Weekly charts

Year-end charts

Certifications

Release history

References

1998 debut singles
1998 songs
Columbia Records singles
Rock ballads
Songs about depression
Songs about California
Songs written by Shawn Mullins